Robert P. Adams (born 26 October 1942) is a Canadian rower. He competed in the 1960 Summer Olympics.

References

1942 births
Living people
Rowers at the 1960 Summer Olympics
Canadian male rowers
Olympic rowers of Canada
Rowers from St. Catharines